SMB3 may refer to:

 Server Message Block version 3, a network protocol in computing
 Super Mario Bros. 3, a 1988 video game
Super Mega Baseball 3, an entry in the Super Mega Baseball video game series.